Spawn: Armageddon is an action-adventure hack and slash video game released in 2003 for the  PlayStation 2, Xbox and GameCube video game consoles. It is inspired by issues 1 through 99 of the Spawn comic book series.

Gameplay
Gameplay focuses on fast and stylish combat gaining high breakable items, Souls, Technique points, comic covers, Time and Ranks. Spawn's main weapon is the Agony Axe (formed by his cape), which can cut through any demon. He is also armed with his trademark chains, which attack with great accuracy and speed. Spawn can find firearms to use on stronger demons. He is capable of using various hellish powers, particularly the necroplasm. The game features upgrades; Spawn must collect demon souls in order to buy ammunition, upgrade his weapons and increase his maximum health or necroplasm bar.

Plot

Spawn stands on a decrepit rooftop in New York City. He receives flashbacks of his former life, and his betrayal by Jason Wynn. A green flash of light tears through the city, signaling the demon's war against the angels in battle known as Armageddon. Knocked off the rooftops, Spawn takes to the street to answer the call and get revenge.

Various characters from the Spawn comic book are featured in the game.

Development

Spawn creator Todd McFarlane directed the game's production.

Marilyn Manson's song "Use Your Fist and Not Your Mouth" from his 2003 album The Golden Age of Grotesque is used for the intro video and credits.

Reception

The game received mixed reviews on all platforms according to video game review aggregator Metacritic. The action was criticized for being basic and repetitive, and the combos described as "lame."

References

External links
Spawn: Armageddon
スポーン運命の鎖
 

2003 video games
Hack and slash games
Namco games
GameCube games
PlayStation 2 games
Video games based on Spawn (comics)
Video games set in hell
Video games set in New York City
Superhero video games
Video games about demons
Video games developed in the United States
Video games featuring black protagonists
Xbox games
Action-adventure games
Single-player video games